Sports in Massachusetts have a long history with both amateur athletics and professional teams. Most of the major professional teams have won multiple championships in their respective leagues.  Massachusetts teams have won 6 Stanley Cups (Boston Bruins),  17 NBA Championships (Boston Celtics),  6  Super Bowls (New England Patriots), and 10 World Series (9 Boston Red Sox, 1 Boston Braves).  The New England Revolution won the MLS Supporter's Shield in 2021 (the club's only major trophy to date). Early basketball and volleyball was created in Massachusetts, which homes the Basketball Hall of Fame (Springfield), and the Volleyball Hall of Fame (Holyoke). Massachusetts also houses the Cape Cod Baseball League.  It is also home to prestigious sports events such as the Boston Marathon and the Head of the Charles Regatta. The Falmouth Road Race in running and the Fitchburg Longsjo Classic in bicycle racing are also very popular events with long histories.

The Greater Boston region is the only city/surrounding area in American professional sports in which all facilities are privately owned and operated. The Patriots and Revolution both own Gillette Stadium in Foxborough, Massachusetts, the Red Sox own Fenway Park, and TD Garden is owned by Delaware North, owner of the Bruins. The Celtics rent TD Garden from Delaware North.

The PGA Tour Deutsche Bank Championship is a regular professional golf tour stop in the state. Massachusetts has played host to nine U.S. Opens, four U.S. Women's Opens, two Ryder Cups, and one U.S. Senior Open.

Many colleges and universities in Massachusetts are active in college athletics. There are a number of NCAA Division I members in the state for multiple sports: Boston College, Boston University, Northeastern University, Harvard University, College of the Holy Cross, University of Massachusetts Amherst, and the University of Massachusetts Lowell.

Notable athletes from Massachusetts 
Massachusetts has produced several successful Olympians including Thomas Burke, James Connolly, and John Thomas (track & field); Butch Johnson (archery); Nancy Kerrigan (figure skating); Todd Richards (snowboarding); Albina Osipowich (swimming); Aly Raisman (gymnastics); Patrick Ewing (basketball); as well as Jim Craig, Mike Eruzione, Bill Cleary, and Keith Tkachuk (ice hockey).

Notable soccer (or association football) players from Massachusetts include Bert Patenaude, Billy Gonsalves, Geoff Cameron, Sam Mewis, and Kristie Mewis. Patenaude and Gonsalves (both inductees of the National Soccer Hall of Fame and natives of Fall River, Massachusetts) played for the U.S. men's national team at the inaugural FIFA World Cup in 1930 (hosted in Uruguay). Patenaude scored the first hat-trick in World Cup history. The USMNT finished in third place. 

=== Sports Illustrated'''s 50 Greatest Sports Figures from Massachusetts ===
In 1999, Sports Illustrated'' published the fifty (50) greatest 19th and 20th century sports figures from each U.S. state. The criteria used was "not necessarily to where [the athletes] were born, but to where they first showed flashes of the greatness to come." The ten highest ranked Massachusetts athletes were as follows:

Major league professional teams

Current teams

Former teams

Major league professional championships

Boston Red Sox (MLB) 
9 World Series titles
1903
1912
1915
1916
1918
2004
2007
2013
2018

Boston Braves (MLB) 

1 World Series title

1914

New England Patriots (NFL) 
6 Super Bowl titles
2001 (XXXVI)
2003 (XXXVIII)
2004 (XXXIX)
2014 (XLIX)
2016 (LI)
2018 (LIII)

Boston Celtics (NBA) 
17 NBA Finals titles
1957
1959
1960
1961
1962
1963
1964
1965
1966
1968
1969
1974
1976
1981
1984
1986
2008

Boston Bruins (NHL) 
6 Stanley Cup titles
1929
1939
1941
1970
1972
2011

New England Whalers (WHA) 
1 Avco World Trophy
1973

Minor league or semi-professional clubs

College sports

NCAA: Divisions I and II

In addition to the schools listed here, Franklin Pierce University, a full Division II member located near the state border in Rindge, New Hampshire, plays its men's and women's ice hockey home games in Massachusetts on the campus of The Winchendon School. FPU plays men's hockey in the Northeast-10 and women's hockey as a D-I program in the New England Women's Hockey Alliance.

NCAA: Division III

NAIA

USCAA

NJCAA Division II

NJCAA Division III

High school

The Massachusetts Interscholastic Athletic Association (MIAA) is an organization that sponsors activities in thirty-three sports, comprising 374 public and private high schools in the U.S. state of Massachusetts. The MIAA is a member of the National Federation of State High School Associations (NFHS), which writes the rules for most U.S. high school sports and activities. The MIAA was founded in 1978, and was preceded by both the Massachusetts Secondary School Principals' Association (MSSPA) (1942–78) and the Massachusetts Interscholastic Athletic Council (MIAC) (1950–78).

Rugby will become the MIAA's 35th sport in 2016, following a 2015 MIAA vote that passed by a wide majority. As of 2015, there are 19 boys’ teams and 5 girls’ teams across the state, with the majority of the Catholic Conference schools fielding rugby teams.

References

External links